The Gilgel Gibe I Dam is a rock-filled embankment dam on the Gilgel Gibe River in Ethiopia. The primary purpose of the dam is hydroelectric power production. The Gilgel Gibe I hydroelectric powerplant has an installed capacity of 184 MW, enough to power over 123,200 households. Construction on the dam began in 1988 but work was halted in 1994. In 1995 construction restarted with a new construction firm. The power station was commissioned in 2004.

References

Gilgel Gibe I
Reservoirs in Ethiopia
Hydroelectric power stations in Ethiopia
Omo River (Ethiopia)
Dams completed in 2004
2004 establishments in Ethiopia
Rock-filled dams
Oromia Region
Underground power stations
Energy infrastructure completed in 2004
21st-century architecture in Ethiopia